The 2007 TVL Premier League or 2007 Port Vila Premier League is the 14th season of the Port Vila Premier League top division.

The winner of the league qualify for the 2008 VFF Bred Cup, the national league of Vanuatu.

Tafea FC were champions and Pango Green Bird relegated to the 2008–09 TVL First Division.

Teams 
 Amicale FC
 Erakor Golden Star
 Ifira Black Bird
 Pango Green Bird
 Tafea FC
 Tupuji Imere
 Westtan Broncos FC
 Yatel FC

Standings

References

External links
 

Port Vila Football League seasons
2007–08 in Vanuatuan football
Port